Starrcade '84: The Million Dollar Challenge was the second annual Starrcade professional wrestling closed-circuit television event that was produced by Jim Crockett Promotions (JCP) under the National Wrestling Alliance (NWA) banner. It took place on November 22, 1984, at the Greensboro Coliseum Complex in Greensboro, North Carolina. The main event of the show was billed as "the Million Dollar Challenge" as the storyline was that the winner of the match would not only win the NWA World Heavyweight Championship but also win a $1,000,000 purse, part of the illusion that professional wrestling was a legitimate sporting competition.

The main event saw champion "The Nature Boy" Ric Flair defend the NWA World Heavyweight Championship against long time rival "The American Dream" Dusty Rhodes, with boxer Joe Frazier acting as the special guest referee for the match. The show also saw the championship matches for the NWA United States Championship, NWA World Television Championship, NWA Florida Heavyweight Championship, NWA Brass Knuckles Championship and NWA Mid-Atlantic Heavyweight Championship.

In 2014, the WWE Network included the previous Starrcades (1983–1986), which had been transmitted via closed-circuit television, alongside the rest of the Starrcades in the pay-per-view section.

Production

Background
From the 1960s to the 1980s, it was tradition for the National Wrestling Alliance (NWA) member Jim Crockett Promotions (JCP) to hold major professional wrestling events at Thanksgiving and Christmas, often at the Greensboro Coliseum in Greensboro, North Carolina in the center of JCP's Virginia, North and South Carolina territory. In 1983, JCP created Starrcade as their supercard to continue the Thanksgiving tradition, bringing in wrestlers from other NWA affiliates and broadcasting the show its territory on closed-circuit television. Starrcade soon became the flagship event of the year for JCP (later World Championship Wrestling, WCW), their Super Bowl event featuring their most important storyline feuds and championship matches. The 1984 event was the second show to use the Starrcade name.

Storylines
The Starrcade show featured a number of professional wrestling matches with different wrestlers involved in pre-existing, scripted feuds, plots, and storylines. Wrestlers were portrayed as either heels (those that portray the "bad guys") or faces (the "good guy" characters) as they followed a series of tension-building events, which culminated in a wrestling match or series of matches.

Aftermath
The WWF national expansion was taking its toll on all the territories, including Jim Crockett Promotions.  Several wrestlers who were planned to appear at the event left beforehand, including Barry Windham and Mike Rotunda, and early in 1985 Rick Steamboat left for the WWF after a dispute with booker Dusty Rhodes, all of them would appear at the first WrestleMania event.  

Wahoo McDaniel would hold the United States Heavyweight title until March, 1985, when he would be defeated (and move to Championship Wrestling from Florida) by a young up-and-comer named Magnum T.A., fresh from Bill Watts' Mid-South Wrestling.  Magnum would later get into a feud with Tully Blanchard (and his "Perfect 10" Baby Doll) over the US title.

Buzz Tyler would go on to capture the Mid-Atlantic Heavyweight title from Dick Slater in March, 1985, but would then leave JCP after a dispute with booker Dusty Rhodes and take the classic title belt with him.  J.J. Dillon would continue to manage Ron Bass and Black Bart into 1985, later adding Buddy Landel to his stable during the year.  Brian Adias would return to World Class Championship Wrestling after Starrcade.

Paul Jones and Jimmy Valiant would continue their years-long feud after Valiant returned to JCP from CWG following his "loser leaves town" period into 1985 and beyond.  

Dusty Rhodes would go on to win the NWA TV title, then the title became the NWA World TV title after JCP purchased Ole Anderson's Championship Wrestling from Georgia in March, 1985. After the buyout, Ole would turn heel and join up with his kayfabe brother Arn Anderson after his arrival in JCP and both help Arn in his feud with Manny Fernandez, then capturing the NWA National Tag Team Championship.

The Zambuie Express would break up during 1985, Kareem Muhammad would spend a short time in Ole Anderson's CWG promotion, then move on to Championship Wrestling from Florida while Elijah Akeem would resume wrestling under his previous incarnation of "Bad Bad Leroy Brown" and move to Japan and then to the UWF.  

Ivan and Nikita Koloff would regain the NWA World Tag Team titles from Rhodes and Fernandez, then Nikita Koloff would begin a feud with Ric Flair over his NWA World Heavyweight title, culminating in a title match at the first Great American Bash in July 1985. Don Kernodle would no longer be in any title hunt, after his return from his (kayfabe) injury by the Koloffs he found himself down to the midcard after the mass influx of new talent (Magnun TA, Arn Anderson, Buddy Landel, Rock and Roll Express, Midnight Express, etc.) to JCP.

Assassin #1 would leave JCP after Starrcade and also move to CWG as a heel under the tutelage of Jimmy Hart before Hart left for the WWF; Assassin #1 left CWG after the buyout by Jim Crockett.  Don Kernodle would fall down the card after his tag team title runs and became enhancement talent for JCP.

Results

Notes

References

1984 in professional wrestling
Starrcade
1984 in North Carolina
Events in Greensboro, North Carolina
Professional wrestling in Greensboro, North Carolina
November 1984 events in the United States